Safer or SAFER may refer to:
 FSO Safer, a Yemeni floating oil storage and offloading vessel
 Safer (surname)
 Safar or safer, the second month of the Islamic calendar
 SAFER, a family of block ciphers
 Safer Alternative for Enjoyable Recreation, a Denver-based marijuana legalization effort
 Simplified Aid For EVA Rescue, a propulsive backpack system
 SAFER barrier or Steel and Foam Energy Reduction barrier, a technology intended to make racing accidents safer
 SubAntarctic Foundation for Ecosystems Research